"Just One Night" is a song written by Terry McBride and recorded by American country music group McBride & the Ride. It was released in November 1992 as the third single from their album Sacred Ground. The song reached number 5 on the Billboard Hot Country Singles & Tracks chart.

Critical reception
Lisa Smith and Cyndi Hoelzle of Gavin Report reviewed the song positively, praising McBride's lead vocals and his bandmates' harmonies.

Music video
The music video was directed by Tom Grubbs and premiered in late 1992.

Chart performance
"Just One Night" debuted at number 72 on the U.S. Billboard Hot Country Singles & Tracks for the week of November 14, 1992.

Year-end charts

References

1992 singles
McBride & the Ride songs
Songs written by Terry McBride (musician)
Song recordings produced by Tony Brown (record producer)
MCA Records singles
1992 songs